Kirsi Ahonen (born 8 April 1976 in Jurva) is a retired Finnish javelin thrower.

She competed at the 2006 European Championships without reaching the final.

Her personal best throw was 60.98 metres, achieved in July 2006 in Helsinki.

References

1976 births
Living people
Finnish female javelin throwers
People from Kurikka
21st-century Finnish women